Pope Field may refer to:

 Pope Field, formerly known as Pope Air Force Base, a military airfield in North Carolina, United States
 Pope Field (Indiana), a general aviation airfield in Indiana, United States

See also
 Alexander Pope Field (1800–1876), a United States politician